A gasp is a paralinguistic respiration in the form of a sudden and sharp inhalation of air through the mouth.

Gasp may also refer to:

 Gasp (2009 film) (气喘吁吁), a Chinese film
 Gasp (2012 film), a short German drama film
 G.A.S.P!! Fighters' NEXTream, a fighting game for the Nintendo 64 
 "Gasp (Harper's Island)", a 2008–2009 TV-series episode 
 GASP, a human gene
 Group Against Smog and Pollution (GASP), popular acronym of environmentalist groups, e.g. Michelle Madoff 
 Gdańsk Autonomous Elementary School (Gdańska Autonomiczna Szkoła Podstawowa), an elementary school in Gdańsk
 Gasp., taxonomic author abbreviation of Guglielmo Gasparrini (1803–1866), Italian botanist and mycologist

See also 

 
 Gaspar (disambiguation)
 Gasper (disambiguation)
 Agonal respiration
 Apneustic respirations
 Asthma
 Dying gasp
 Sleep apnea